Akosua Adoma Owusu (born January 1, 1984) is a Ghanaian-American filmmaker and producer. Her films explore the colliding identities of black immigrants in America through multiple forms ranging from cinematic essays to experimental narratives to reconstructed Black popular media. Interpreting the notion of "double consciousness," coined by sociologist and civil rights activist W. E. B. Du Bois, Owusu aims to create a third cinematic space or consciousness. In her work, feminism, queerness, and African identities interact in African, white American, and black American cultural spaces.

She is currently a Visiting Lecturer at Harvard University and the Pratt Institute in Brooklyn, New York.

Early life and education 

Owusu was born to Ghanaian parents and raised in an immigrant community in Alexandria, Virginia. She is the youngest of three siblings to Grace and Albert A. Owusu, Sr. Owusu holds master's degrees in the School of Film/Video and School of Fine Art from California Institute of the Arts, which she earned in 2008. She graduated with a Bachelors interdisciplinary degree in Media Studies and Studio Art with distinction from the University of Virginia in 2005. Owusu began her career as a post-production assistant on Chris Rock’s HBO documentary “Good Hair” (2009). Soon thereafter, she transitioned to making her own short, experimental films.

Career 

Shortly after graduating from CalArts in 2008, Owusu was a featured artist of the 56th Robert Flaherty Film Seminar programmed by renowned critic and film curator Dennis Lim. Named by Indiewire as one of the six Avant-Garde Female Filmmakers Who Redefined Cinema, and one of The Huffington Post‘s Black Artists: 30 Contemporary Art Makers Under 40 You Should Know, Owusu was a 2013 MacDowell Colony Fellow and a 2015 Guggenheim Fellow.

In 2020, Owusu received the Lincoln Center Award for Emerging Artists bestowed by Film at Lincoln Center.

Indiewire describes Owusu's shape-shifting film style:

 Trafficking in the “complex contradictions” of blackness, displacement and memory, Owusu seamlessly transitions between experimental cinema, fine art and African tradition in order to create avant-garde films that question the nature of identity.

Her “warring consciousness” as she describes it, becomes the point of departure for her film Me broni ba (my white baby). Using hair as a medium of culture, she examines African and African-American identities and ideologies in an effort to resolve their differences. Ed Halter, one of the founders of Light Industry in Brooklyn listed Me Broni Ba as one of 2010's top ten films in Artforum magazine.

She has produced award-winning films including Reluctantly Queer (2016) and Kwaku Ananse. In 2013, Kwaku Ananse received a Golden Bear nomination at the Berlinale and won the 2013 Africa Movie Academy Award for the West African nation of Ghana in the Best Short Film category. The film, which starred Ghanaian artist Jojo Abot, was supported by Focus Features' Africa First, and had its North American debut at the 2013 Toronto International Film Festival. Kwaku Ananse was also included in the 2013 Académie des Arts et Techniques du Cinéma - César Golden Nights, a program organized with support from UNESCO that selects notable short films.

Reluctantly Queer (2016) produced in collaboration with Dr. Kwame Edwin Otu, an Assistant Professor of African American and African Studies at the University of Virginia was nominated for the Golden Bear and Teddy Award at the 2016 Berlin International Film Festival. It had its North American premiere as part of the New Directors/New Films Festival.

In 2017, Owusu  wrote and directed "On Monday of Last Week", a film adaptation of a short story of the same name from celebrated author Chimamanda Ngozi Adichie's short story collection, "The Thing Around Your Neck." The film which featured American actress Karyn Parsons best known for her role as Hilary Banks on the NBC sitcom The Fresh Prince of Bel-Air, secured a nomination at the 2017 African Movie Academy Awards. The film went on to screen at the Fowler Museum, ICA London  and the 25th New York African Film Festival co-presented by Film at Lincoln Center.

Owusu said in a 2015 interview with South Africa's Elle (magazine), Owusu said "I began filming in Ghana as a way to find a place in my Ghanaian heritage.  I often refer to myself as a Ghanaian-American, but I do consider myself to be an American filmmaker of Ghanaian descent. When I am in America, I feel very Ghanaian and when I’m in Ghana, I feel more American. I started traveling to Ghana with my friends from America to help me with the trauma of dealing with blackness both in Africa and in the African diaspora. My love for Africa was informed by romantic ideas about the continent as a home awaiting my arrival. Filming in Ghana, forms part of this journey."

In 2014, Akosua Adoma Owusu was one of the Executive Producers for Afronauts a science fiction short film written and directed by young Ghanaian filmmaker Nuotama Bodomo.

In 2013, Owusu was nominated for Tribeca Film Institute's Heineken Affinity Award's $20,000 prize.

In 2013, Owusu's film Split Ends, I Feel Wonderful (2012) received the Tom Berman Award for Most Promising Filmmaker at the 51st Ann Arbor Film Festival in Michigan.

In 2011, Owusu participated as a member of the international jury at the Festival des trois continents in Nantes, France.

In 2011, Owusu exhibited work in Cusp: Works on Film & Video by Kevin Jerome Everson & Akosua Adoma Owusu at the Luggage Store Gallery. Called the “intimate and the ideal realization of the vision of a valuable genius", this show included Revealing Roots, a silent re-enactment of one of the most dramatic scenes from Alex Haley's Roots (1977 miniseries) combining found footage and scenes that star Owusu and other African actors.

An anthology of Owusu's work has been granted to Grasshopper Film LLC.

She is represented by Farber Law LLC.

Her films are produced under her production company Obibini Pictures LLC.

Permanent collections 

Her work is included in the permanent collections of the Whitney Museum of American Art, the Centre Georges Pompidou, and the Fowler Museum at UCLA.

Rex Cinema 

In 2013, Owusu launched a global Kickstarter initiative to ‘Save the Rex’! The Rex Cinema is one of Ghana's oldest cinema houses. During a time of political insecurity in Ghana in the 60s, 70s and 80s, there was a decline in the Arts. All of the cinema houses closed down in the wake of military coups and curfews. Owusu sought to save Rex Cinema for the purpose of preserving cinema houses. In 2016, Owusu developed a screenplay based on her global campaign to Save the Rex Cinema in Ghana at the Camargo Foundation in Cassis, France. In 2017, The Guardian announced that Owusu was working on a part-real life, part-fictionalized feature film about her campaign to restore the historic Rex cinema.

International accomplishments 

In 2015, Two films directed and produced by Owusu were critics' picks in Artforum magazine.

Owusu's film Reluctantly Queer was one of critics’ best films of 2016 in Sight & Sound, a monthly film magazine published by the British Film Institute (BFI)

In 2016, Owusu was named by Britain's Royal African Society as their Human of the Week  and by South Africa's Elle (magazine) as one of 50 incredible women.

In 2017, she was named in Dazed magazine as one of ten experimental filmmakers tackling the world's big topics.

In 2018, Owusu was commissioned by the Cobo Center to produce a video installation along Jefferson and Washington avenues in downtown Detroit, Michigan during Black History Month.

Owusu was awarded an artist-in-residence by the Goethe-Institut Vila Sul in Salvador, Bahia Brazil, in 2018, along with celebrated British installation artist and filmmaker Isaac Julien.

Owusu participated as a distinguished juror at the 57th annual Ann Arbor Film Festival and presented a special program dedicated to her body of work.

In 2019, she led a workshop for filmmakers, critics and researchers on Triple Consciousness at Cinema Camp an annual four-day long summer event organized by Meno Avilys Film Center based in Vilnius, Lithuania.

Owusu's film White Afro received the Premio Medien Patent Verwaltung AG prize in Pardi di domani (Leopards of Tomorrow) section of the 2019 Locarno Festival in Switzerland. The film was subtitled in three central European languages.

Owusu's film Pelourinho: They Don't Really Care About Us was one of critics’ best films of 2019 in Sight & Sound magazine published by the British Film Institute (BFI).

Selected exhibitions 

2020: Akosua Adoma Owusu: Welcome to the Jungle at the Museum of Modern Art Documentary Fortnight 
2019: Akosua Adoma Owusu: Welcome to the Jungle at Contemporary Arts Center (New Orleans)
2019: Akosua Adoma Owusu: Welcome to the Jungle at Wattis Institute for Contemporary Arts
2019: Between Three Worlds: Films by Akosua Adoma Owusu at REDCAT
2019: Triple Consciousness: Films by Akosua Adoma Owusu at the Yerba Buena Center for the Arts
2019: Sala de Video: Akosua Adoma Owusu at the São Paulo Museum of Art
2019: Triple Consciousness: Films by Akosua Adoma Owusu at the Institute for Contemporary Art, Richmond
2019: Screening: Akosua Adoma Owusu at the Museum of Contemporary Art, Chicago
2018: Triple Consciousness at BOZAR, Centre for Fine Arts, Brussels; 
2018: African Twilight at the Bowers Museum; 
2018: Fragments of a Dream at the McNay Art Museum; 
2018: Screening and Conversation with Director Akosua Adoma Owusu at the Fowler Museum at UCLA; 
2017: Akosua Adoma Owusu and Bus Nut at the Atlanta Contemporary Art Center; 
2016: Making Africa: Akosua Adoma Owusu at Centre de Cultura Contemporània de Barcelona  
2016: Films by Akosua Adoma Owusu at Tabakalera 
2016: Encuentro con Akosua Adoma Owusu at the Museo de Arte Contemporáneo de Castilla y León 
2016: L'évènement Akosua Adoma Owusu at the Centre Georges Pompidou 
2016: Triple Consciousness at the Museum of Fine Arts, Houston
2016: Dreamlands: Immersive Cinema and Art, 1905–2016 at the Whitney Museum of American Art 
2015: Modern Mondays: An Evening with Akosua Adoma Owusu at the Museum of Modern Art 
2015: Existential Crisis at the Rochester Art Center
2015: America Is Hard to See at the Whitney Museum of American Art
2015: The Art of Hair in Africa at the Fowler Museum at UCLA
2015: Two Films by Akosua Adoma Owusu at Art and Practice  in association with the Hammer Museum
2015: Do/Tell at the Institute of Contemporary Art, Philadelphia
2014: Prospect.3: Notes for Now New Orleans Triennial
2013: Films by Akosua Adoma Owusu at the Moderna Museet
2012: Fore at the Studio Museum in Harlem
2012: The Bearden Project at the Studio Museum in Harlem
2011: VideoStudio: Changing Same at the Studio Museum in Harlem
2011: Quadruple Consciousness at the Vox Populi (art gallery)
2009: 30 Seconds Off an Inch at the Studio Museum in Harlem
2009: Me Broni Ba at the Museum of Modern Art Documentary Fortnight

Awards and nominations

Filmography

Filmography

Further reading 

Owusu, Akosua Adoma, and Adwoa Adu-Gyamfi. Me broni ba. New York, NY: Cinema Guild (2009).
Baron, Jaimie. Inappropriate Bodies: Contemporary Filmmakers Challenging Gender Constructions through Appropriation.  UCLA Center for the Study of Women (2009).
Birchall, Danny. Things Said Again (2010) Film Quarterly Volume 63, Issue 3, pg. 55-57
Nelmes, Jill. Introduction to Film Studies (2012) 
Dovey, Lindiwe. African Feminist Engagements with Film (2012) , p. 18-23.
Mask, Mia, Contemporary Black American Cinema: Race, Gender and Sexuality at the Movies (2012).
Kendall, Nzingha, Commentary: Haunting in Akosua Adoma Owusu's Short Experimental Films (2013). Black Camera
Agyeman, Erica. Akosua Adoma Owusu: Exploring 'Threeness, The International Review of African American Art 24.3 (2013), 11–13.
Prabhu, Anjali. Contemporary Cinema of Africa and the Diaspora  (2014).
Laderman, David. Sampling Media  (2014).
UNESCO. Égalité des genres: patrimoine et créativité  (2014).
Ellerson, Beti. Gaze Regimes: Film And Feminisms In Africa (2015) 
Johnson, Elizabeth. Female Narratives in Nollywood Melodramas (2016) , p. 113.
Kelly, Gabrielle. Celluloid Ceiling: Women Film Directors Breaking Through (2018) 
Lené Hole, Kristin. Film Feminisms: A Global Introduction  (2018).
Bisschoff, Lizelle. Women in African Cinema: Beyond the Body Politic.  (2019).
Nyeck, S.N. Routledge Handbook of Queer African Studies  (2019).
Williams, James S. Ethics and Aesthetics in Contemporary African Cinema: The Politics of Beauty  (2019).
Dasilva, Dax. Age of Union: Igniting The Changemaker  (2020).
Huberman, Anthony. Abbas to Yuki: Writing Alongside Exhibitions  (2020).

External links

Official Website
Akosua Adoma Owusu at the Internet Movie Database
Akosua Adoma Owusu on MUBI
Black women filmmakers
Ghanaian Filmmakers

References 

Living people
1984 births
University of Virginia alumni
Ghanaian women film directors
Ghanaian film directors
People from Virginia
Film directors from Virginia
Artists from Virginia
American women film producers
African-American film directors
African-American women artists
American women artists
American women film directors
American video artists
California Institute of the Arts alumni
People from Alexandria, Virginia
African-American artists
Ghanaian artists
21st-century African-American people
21st-century African-American women
20th-century African-American people
20th-century African-American women
American people of Ghanaian descent
Ghanaian American